The Storm is a 2012 mystery novel by Clive Cussler and Graham Brown. It was first published by Putnam in the US and Michael Joseph in the UK. The novel was Cussler's 10th novel in his NUMA Files Adventure Series, and follows the adventures of Kurt Austin and Joe Zavala, who while on a NUMA ship in the Indian Ocean, come across a grisly discovery of an abandoned ship having been attacked by mysterious black particles that may have a disastrous global environmental impact.

Locations
 Yemen
 Indian Ocean
 Egypt, Aswan Dam

References

2012 American novels
Novels by Clive Cussler
G. P. Putnam's Sons books
The NUMA Files
Collaborative novels
Michael Joseph books